Paul Anthony Kelly (born 12 September 1984) is a retired English mixed martial artist who is best known for his nine-fight stint in the Ultimate Fighting Championship.

Kelly was sentenced to thirteen years in prison for heroin trafficking in 2013. He was released in 2019.

Mixed martial arts career

Background
Coming from an amateur boxer family, Kelly grew up in boxing gyms and got in a lot of altercations in his youth. He was expelled from school and never completed his education.

Kelly started out his mixed martial arts career in Liverpool, England at the Wolfslair MMA academy which was once home to The Ultimate Fighter 3 winner Michael Bisping. However, he  later moved across town to Team Kaobon, home of former UFC lightweight Terry Etim and retired UFC lightweight Paul Taylor.

Ultimate Fighting Championship

He made his UFC debut at UFC 80: Rapid Fire, where he won a decision victory over his opponent Paul Taylor. Kelly and Taylor were both awarded $35,000 as a bonus for Fight of the Night. The fight was ranked #100 on UFC's Ultimate 100 Greatest Fights.

Kelly was scheduled to fight Jonathan Goulet at UFC 85, but Goulet pulled out citing a lack of preparation. Before another opponent was found, Kelly himself had to withdraw from the event after injuring his right hand during training.

Kelly was defeated by Marcus Davis via submission at UFC 89.

Kelly defeated Troy Mandaloniz at UFC 95. Kelly battered Mandaloniz from top position throughout the fight. He opened cuts above both of Mandaloniz's eyes with elbows and punches. The judges scored the fight (30–27, 30–27, 30–28) for a unanimous decision for Kelly.

After the fight with Mandaloniz, Kelly announced he was moving from welterweight to lightweight.  Kelly said he wanted to make the drop after leaving the division on a winning note.

Kelly fought Rolando Delgado at UFC 99 in Cologne, Germany. This was his first fight at lightweight. Kelly defeated Roli after going all three rounds giving Kelly the unanimous decision victory.

Kelly lost his fight against Dennis Siver at UFC 105 after having his ribs injured by a spinning back kick and getting hit by punches from Siver. This was his first fight under Team Kaobon. Kelly revealed afterwards that his ribs had already been damaged going into the fight, a by-product of the notoriously hard-contact sparring sessions at Kaobon.

Kelly then looked to bounce back, against Matt Veach on the UFC 112 card in Abu Dhabi. At 3:41 of the second round, Kelly pulled off a guillotine choke submission and was victorious.

This was then intended to be followed up with a fight against Jacob Volkmann at the UFC 116 prelims, on 3 July. However, the fight was moved on 1 August, to the UFC Live: Jones vs. Matyushenko card due to visa issues forcing him out of the 116 card. Volkmann went on to defeat Kelly via unanimous decision (all judges scoring the bout 30–27).

Kelly was expected to face Gabe Ruediger on 20 November 2010, at UFC 123. However, Ruediger was forced out of the bout with a groin injury. Ruediger was replaced by TUF 12 competitor TJ O'Brien. After initially struggling to hit O'Brien's chin, due to the height disadvantage, Kelly was able to connect and dropped O'Brien with a combination. Later in the second round, Kelly secured a crucifix and hit O'Brien with multiple elbows, resulting in a TKO stoppage.

Kelly was expected to face Sam Stout on 5 February 2011, at UFC 126, but Stout was forced from the bout with an injury and replaced by Donald Cerrone. Kelly lost to Cerrone via submission due to a rear-naked choke. Although he lost, the performance earned him and Cerrone Fight of the Night honors.

In the aftermath of his loss to Cerrone, Kelly was released from the promotion, leaving the company with a 5-4 record.

Post UFC
Kelly was expected to face Afakasi Sione at UCMMA 21 in England on 25 June. However, due to an injury Kelly had to withdraw from the bout.

Kelly was expected to fight at Legacy FC 9 on 16 December 2011 against Jeff Rexroad. However, Kelly pulled out of the fight due to visa issues and has been replaced by Efrain Escudero, However, Efrain was resigned to the UFC, causing him to withdraw from the bout.

Super Fight League
Kelly, along with Xavier Foupa-Pokam and Lena Ovchynnikova signed a four-fight contract with the Super Fight League.

He made his debut for them at SFL 2 against WEC and Strikeforce veteran Ryan Healy. He lost the fight via unanimous decision.

UCMMA
There has been an ongoing feud between Kelly and Richard Griffin over the last few weeks which has resulted in them being booked to fight at UCMMA 31. They were having a disagreement over a fight that Richard Griffin and Ross Pointon had in the Dominican Republic that was recently posted on the UCMMA Facebook page. Kelly stated that he thought Griffin was lucky in his fight with Pointon and that "The Real Deal" would win that match-up 9 times out of ten. Griffin felt disrespected and fired back with some insults of his own, which including jabs at Kelly being dropped by the UFC. Both men then called for a fight in the cage to settle the matter, in which Dave O’Donnell decided to approach both men to arrange the fight.

Kelly and Griffin settled this feud on 1 December with Kelly winning via guillotine choke in the second round.

Post-conviction career
Having been active at the gym and studying nutrition during his prison sentence, Kelly returned to the regional mixed martial arts competition at Probellum 1: Liverpool on 7 March 2020. Kelly faced Simone Bottino, winning the bout in the second round via technical knockout.

In February 2021, Kelly announced his retirement from the sport.

Personal life

Kelly had his first child, a daughter named Phoebe in June 2008.

Drug trafficking conviction
In May 2013, Kelly was found guilty of heroin trafficking in the United Kingdom and was sentenced to 13 years in prison. However, Kelly was put on work release in 2017 and had completed his sentence and thus released in May 2019. During his work release, Kelly started a healthy eating restaurant in Liverpool.

Championships and accomplishments
Ultimate Fighting Championship
Fight of the Night (Two times) vs. Paul Taylor and Donald Cerrone.

Mixed martial arts record

|-
| Win
| align=center| 15–5
| Simone Bottino
| TKO (elbows and punches)
| Probellum 1: Liverpool
| 
| align=center| 2
| align=center| 1:37
| Liverpool, United Kingdom
| 
|-
| Win
| align=center| 14–5
| Henrique Santana
| TKO (punches)
| UWC 22
| 
| align=center| 1
| align=center| 3:47
| Essex, England, United Kingdom
| 
|-
| Win
| align=center| 13–5
| Richard Griffin
| Submission (guillotine choke)
| UCMMA 31
| 
| align=center| 2
| align=center| 2:52
| London, England, United Kingdom
| 
|-
| Loss
| align=center| 12–5
| Ryan Healy
| Decision (unanimous)
| SFL 2
| 
| align=center| 3
| align=center| 5:00
| Chandigarh, India
| 
|-
| Loss
| align=center| 12–4
| Donald Cerrone
| Submission (rear-naked choke)
| UFC 126
| 
| align=center| 2
| align=center| 3:48
| Las Vegas, Nevada, United States
| 
|-
| Win
| align=center| 12–3
| TJ O'Brien
| TKO (elbows)
| UFC 123
| 
| align=center| 2
| align=center| 3:16
| Auburn Hills, Michigan, United States
| 
|-
| Loss
| align=center| 11–3
| Jacob Volkmann
| Decision (unanimous)
| UFC Live: Jones vs. Matyushenko
| 
| align=center| 3
| align=center| 5:00
| San Diego, California, United States
| 
|-
| Win
| align=center| 11–2
| Matt Veach
| Submission (guillotine choke)
| UFC 112
| 
| align=center| 2
| align=center| 3:41
| Abu Dhabi, United Arab Emirates
| 
|-
| Loss
| align=center| 10–2
| Dennis Siver
| TKO (spinning back kick and punches)
| UFC 105
| 
| align=center| 2
| align=center| 2:53
| Manchester, England
| 
|-
| Win
| align=center| 10–1
| Rolando Delgado
| Decision (unanimous)
| UFC 99
| 
| align=center| 3
| align=center| 5:00
| Cologne, Germany
| 
|-
| Win
| align=center| 9–1
| Troy Mandaloniz
| Decision (unanimous)
| UFC 95
| 
| align=center| 3
| align=center| 5:00
| London, England
| 
|-
| Loss
| align=center| 8–1
| Marcus Davis
| Submission (guillotine choke)
| UFC 89
| 
| align=center| 2
| align=center| 2:16
| Birmingham, England
| 
|-
|  Win
| align=center| 8–0
| Paul Taylor
| Decision (unanimous)
| UFC 80
| 
| align=center| 3
| align=center| 5:00
| Newcastle upon Tyne, England
| 
|-
|  Win
| align=center| 7–0
| Jordan James
| TKO (punches)
| Cage Gladiators 4: Prepare for Glory
| 
| align=center| 2
| align=center| 2:40
| Liverpool, England
| 
|-
|  Win
| align=center| 6–0
| Sami Berik
| Submission (rear-naked choke)
| Cage Warriors: Enter The Rough House 3
| 
| align=center| 1
| align=center| 1:27
| Nottingham, England
| 
|-
|  Win
| align=center| 5–0
| Marius Liaukevicius
| Submission (arm-triangle choke)
| Clash of Warriors
| 
| align=center| 1
| align=center| 1:10
| England
| 
|-
|  Win
| align=center| 4–0
| Bruce Davis
| TKO (doctor stoppage)
| House of Pain Fight Night 6: The Real Deal
| 
| align=center| 1
| align=center| 3:38
| Swansea, Wales
| 
|-
|  Win
| align=center| 3–0
| James Neal
| TKO (punches)
| Ultimate Force
| 
| align=center| 1
| align=center| 3:02
| South Yorkshire, England
| 
|-
|  Win
| align=center| 2–0
| Nigel Whitear
| TKO (punches)
| FX3: Battle of Britain
| 
| align=center| 1
| align=center| 0:54
| England
| 
|-
|  Win
| align=center| 1–0
| Ian McAleese
| TKO (punches)
| CWFC: Quest 2
| 
| align=center| 1
| align=center| 1:21
| England
|

References

External links
 
 

1984 births
Living people
21st-century English criminals
Criminals from Merseyside
English drug traffickers
English male criminals
English male mixed martial artists
English people convicted of drug offences
Lightweight mixed martial artists
Mixed martial artists utilizing boxing
Martial artists from Liverpool
Prisoners and detainees of England and Wales
Ultimate Fighting Championship male fighters